Suraj Dongre (born 27 December 1989) is an Indian first-class cricketer who plays for Goa. He made his first-class debut for Goa in the 2014–15 Ranji Trophy on 29 January 2012.

References

External links
 

1989 births
Living people
Indian cricketers
Goa cricketers
People from Belgaum
Cricketers from Karnataka